The 1944 Clay Cross by-election was held on 14 April 1944.  The byelection was held due to the death of the incumbent Labour MP, George Ridley.  It was won by the Labour candidate Harold Neal.

D. Craven Griffiths, a Liberal who worked for the civil service wanted to stand in the by-election. The President of the Board of Trade refused him permission for a leave of absence to fight a campaign.

References

1944 elections in the United Kingdom
1944 in England
1940s in Derbyshire
By-elections to the Parliament of the United Kingdom in Derbyshire constituencies
April 1944 events